Anacrusis turrialbae is a species of moth of the family Tortricidae. It is found in Costa Rica.

The wingspan is about 27 mm for males and 31 mm for females. The ground colour of the forewings of the males is brownish grey to the middle and in the dorsal third, forming cream edged spots. The hindwings are brown edged orange. The ground colour of the females is brown ferruginous. The hindwings are brown, but orange terminally.

References

Moths described in 2011
Atteriini
Moths of Central America
Taxa named by Józef Razowski